Slepi potnik is a novel by Slovenian author . It was first published in 1999. In Slovenian, “slepi potnik” means ‘stowaway’, although it literally to ‘blind passenger’.

See also
List of Slovenian novels

References

Slovenian novels
1999 novels